Shankar is an Indian actor who has worked in Malayalam and Tamil films. He acted in nearly 200 films and was a leading actor in Malayalam cinema during the 1980s. Shankar's debut Tamil film Oru Thalai Ragam, and Malayalam debut, Manjil Virinja Pookkal, completed a theatrical run of 365 and 250 days respectively. He was the most successful romantic hero in Malayalam movies along with Prem Nazir.

Early life

Shankar was born to Thekkeveettil N. K. Panicker and Sulochana in Kechery, Thrissur, Kerala in 1960. His family later moved to Chennai when he was four years old. His father was a senior manager at Indian Drugs and Pharmaceuticals Limited. He has two siblings, Krishnakumar and Indra. He completed the schooling from St. Bede's Anglo Indian Higher Secondary School, Chennai. He pursued a Bachelors in History from Hemwati Nandan Bahuguna Garhwal University, Rishikesh. Later he completed 2 years of acting course at South Indian Film Chamber School of Acting, Chennai.

Career

As an actor
Shankar's first film was legendary superstar Jayan starred Sharapanjaram in 1979.Then Shankar as the lead actor of Oru Thalai Ragam, through audition. Oru Thalai Ragam not only completed 365 days run in theatres but also became a cult romantic film of Tamil film history. Then Navodaya Studio signed Shankar for their romantic film Manjil Virinja Pookkal along with newcomers Mohanlal and Poornima Jayaram, directed by Fazil. The success of Manjil Virinja Pookal  and films like Kadathu opposite Roja Ramani, Oothikachiya Ponnu with Poornima Jayaram and Ente Mohangal Poovaninju cemented Shankar as the romantic hero of Malayalam films. Simultaneously his Tamil films Sujatha, Koyil Puraa, Mouna Yuddham and Raagam Thedum Pallavi also done okay business.

Success continued in Malayalam with Shanker getting chance in movies of hit directors like P.G. Viswambharan , Joshiy and I.V. Sasi with movies like Padayottam, Anuragakodathy, Veendum Chalikkunna Chakram, Sandhyakku Virinja Poovu and Engane Nee Marakkum, so he decided to concentrate on Malayalam films. His other successful films of 1983 are Mortuary, Hello Madras Girl and Himam. In 1984, Shankar appeared in Ente Kalithozhan, Arante Mulla Kochu Mulla, Muthodumuthu, Poochakkoru Mookkuthi and Itha Innu Muthal. Next year he was a part of the films Archana Aaradhana, Ambada Njaane!, Aram + Aram = Kinnaram and Vannu Kandu Keezhadakki.

In mid 80's Shankar began losing his market for doing repetitive roles, so he became a producer to save his career with Sibi Malayil's Chekkaeran Oru Chilla, but the film flopped. His other major films of that year were Naale Njangalude Vivahum, Oppam Oppathinoppam and Sughamo Devi along with Mohanlal. Shankar had fewer Malayalam releases in the late '80s and his attempt to become director with Suresh Gopi starrer Rakshakan also did not materialize, so he decided to take a break from films to concentrate on business, although he did guest roles in the films Manathe Kottaram, Gandharvam and Guru.

Shankar staged a comeback as lead hero in the films  Sooryavanam (1998), Bhadra, Sundarippravu and The Fire. He also acted in Stalin Sivadas with Mammootty, but all these films failed at the box-office. So he moved to television with a successful serial Ithu Manju Pole and continued to perform in serials Swara Raagam and Parasparam. He also won the 2006 Film Critics Television Best Actor Award for his performance in TV serial Chithrashalabham. His last serial Ammakkayi (aired in Surya TV) was a success. As he wanted to concentrate in films, he stopped doing serials and made his debut as a director with Virus, a film on HIV/AIDS, which was censored in 2007.

Later Shankar appeared in films like Ividam Swargamanu, Casanovva alongside Mohanlal, Rhythm, Koottukar, Banking Hours 10 to 4, Hide N' Seek, Father's Day, Oomakkuyil Padumbol and Bhoomiyude Avakashikal. In 2013, he was appreciated for his good performance in a comic role in Anoop Menon scripted film Hotel California. His other releases were Miss Lekha Tharoor Kaanunnathu and Cleopatra, Naku Penda Naku Taka and in 2015, Shankar played the lead role in Vishwasam... Athallae Ellaam along with Shine Tom Chacko directed by Jayaraj Vijay, but the film flopped. In 2018 he starred in Niranjana Pookkal as hero. He also starred in Bhramam along with Prithviraj Sukumaran in 2021.

As a director
Shankar directed a video film Kaatti in 2006 based on child labour which won him the best director award from Malayalam Television viewers DRISHYA awards for video film. He made his feature film debut with Virus, an Indo-American co-production urging society not to shun HIV/AIDS affected people. His first commercial Malayalam directorial venture Keralotsavam 2009 starred Kalabhavan Mani and Vinu Mohan dealt with how three youngsters falling prey to terrorist links. In 2015, he directed Sand City, a Tamil film based at U.A.E. to good review.

Personal life
Shankar's first marriage was with Radhika in December 1992, that ended in a divorce. After the failure of his first marriage, he married Rooparekha, that also ended in divorce. The couple has a son named Gokul. In 2013, he married Chitra Lekshmi, a dance teacher, settled at U.K.

Filmography

References

External links 
 

Male actors from Thrissur
20th-century Indian male actors
Male actors in Tamil cinema
Living people
1960 births
Male actors in Malayalam cinema
Indian male film actors
Malayalam film directors
Tamil film directors
21st-century Indian male actors
21st-century Indian film directors
Film directors from Thrissur
Indian male television actors
Male actors in Malayalam television